The Pennsauken Public Schools are a comprehensive community public school district serving students in pre-kindergarten through twelfth grade from Pennsauken Township, in Camden County, New Jersey, United States.

As of the 2019–20 school year, the district, comprised of nine schools, had an enrollment of 4,819 students and 396.5 classroom teachers (on an FTE basis), for a student–teacher ratio of 12.2:1.

The district is classified by the New Jersey Department of Education as being in District Factor Group "CD", the sixth-highest of eight groupings. District Factor Groups organize districts statewide to allow comparison by common socioeconomic characteristics of the local districts. From lowest socioeconomic status to highest, the categories are A, B, CD, DE, FG, GH, I and J.

Students from Merchantville had attended the high school as part of a sending/receiving relationship that began in 1972, when the borough's high school was closed. For years, the Merchantville district had sought to end the relationship with the Pennsauken district. In the wake of a 2015 decision by the New Jersey Department of Education, Merchantville students began attending Haddon Heights High School starting in the 2015–2016 school year, as part of a transition that will be fully in place in the 2018–2019 school year.

Governance
In 1996 the district stated that a parent survey on school uniforms showed 68% of respondents favoring them.

Schools
Schools in the district (with 2019–20 enrollment data from the National Center for Education Statistics) are:
Preschool
Baldwin Early Childhood Learning Center (107 students in grade PreK)
Dana Gery, Principal
Elementary schools
Alfred E. Burling Elementary School (N/A; K-5) 
Dr. Ronnie Tarchichi, Principal 
Delair Elementary School (359; K-3)
Rosalyn Lawrence, Principal
George B. Fine Elementary School (275; PreK-3)
Thomas Honeyman, Principal
Benjamin Franklin Elementary School (397; PreK-3)
Susan Galloza, Principal
Carson Elementary School (378; PreK-3)
Diane Joyce, Principal
Middle schools
Pennsauken Intermediate School (683; 4–5)
Tanya Harmon, Principal
Howard M. Phifer Middle School (1,113; 6–8)
Sandra Allen, Principal
High schools
Pennsauken High School (1,351; 9–12)
Richard Bonkowski, Principal

Administration
Core members of the district's administration are:
Ronnie Tarchichi, Superintendent
John Ogunkanmi, Business Administrator / Board Secretary

Board of education
The district's board of education, comprised of nine members, sets policy and oversees the fiscal and educational operation of the district through its administration. As a Type II school district, the board's trustees are elected directly by voters to serve three-year terms of office on a staggered basis, with three seats up for election each year held (since 2012) as part of the November general election. The board appoints a superintendent to oversee the day-to-day operation of the district.

References

Notes

External links
Pennsauken Public Schools
 
School Data for the Pennsauken Public Schools, National Center for Education Statistics

Pennsauken Township, New Jersey
New Jersey District Factor Group CD
School districts in Camden County, New Jersey